This is a list of the best selling manga published weekly by Oricon in Japan in 2015.

Chart history

See also
2015 in manga

References 

2015 manga
2015 in comics
2015